Gerard Vissering (1 March 1865 – 19 December 1937) was the President of De Nederlandsche Bank from 1912 till 1931.

In the period between 1919 and 1937, he was a member and vice-chairman of the Zuiderzeeraad. He was also chairman of the State Commission on studying the issue of the Zuiderzee grounds.

In 1928, having been invited to Turkey, he helped the Central Bank of Turkey with a report highlighting the necessity of an independent central bank not to be affiliated to the Government.

Gerard Vissering was a son of Finance Minister Simon Vissering (1818-1888) and Grietje Corver (1825-1898).

External links 
 VISSERING, Gerard (1865-1937), Institute for Dutch History.

1865 births
1937 deaths
Dutch economists
Dutch bankers
People from Leiden
Presidents of the Central Bank of the Netherlands